Christophe Jérôme Dugarry (born 24 March 1972) is a French former professional footballer who played as a forward. His clubs include Bordeaux, Milan, Barcelona, Marseille, Birmingham City and Qatar SC. He was also a member of the France team that won the 1998 World Cup and Euro 2000.

Club career
Dugarry came through the youth ranks at Bordeaux alongside future France teammates Bixente Lizarazu and Zinedine Zidane. He spent eight years at Bordeaux, scoring 34 goals in 187 appearances. His two goals against A.C. Milan in the 1995–96 UEFA Cup quarter-finals helped to seal a move to that club for the 1996–97 season.

Dugarry managed just 5 goals in 27 appearances for Milan, before joining Barcelona the following season. After only seven appearances in his sole season there, he returned to France, first with Marseille. He then returned to Bordeaux, where he played another 65 games, scoring 9 goals.

In 2003, he joined Birmingham City on loan as the second World Cup-winner to join the team, the first being Argentinian Alberto Tarantini in 1978. His prominence earned him rough treatment from opposition defenders. After a run of 5 goals in 4 matches cemented the club's Premier League status, moving them from the relegation zone to 13th, Dugarry joined the club on a permanent two-year deal in May 2003. He saw out less than the first season, scoring once in 15 appearances before leaving the club by mutual consent, citing family reasons. He then signed a one-year contract with Qatar SC, where he made no appearances. Following this, he retired from football in 2005. He has since been inducted into Birmingham City's Hall of Fame.

International career
Dugarry made his international debut in a 1–0 win against Australia on 26 May 1994. He was capped 55 times for the France national team and scored eight goals.

With France, Dugarry won the 1998 FIFA World Cup, Euro 2000 and the 2001 FIFA Confederations Cup. He also played at UEFA Euro 1996 and the 2002 FIFA World Cup.

Career statistics

Club

International

Scores and results list France's goal tally first, score column indicates score after each Dugarry goal.

Honours
Bordeaux
Coupe de la Ligue: 2001–02
Division 2: 1991–92
UEFA Intertoto Cup: 1995

France
FIFA World Cup: 1998
UEFA European Championship: 2000
FIFA Confederations Cup: 2001

Orders
Knight of the Legion of Honour: 1998

References

External links

 
 

Chevaliers of the Légion d'honneur
French footballers
France international footballers
Birmingham City F.C. players
FC Girondins de Bordeaux players
Olympique de Marseille players
A.C. Milan players
Serie A players
Expatriate footballers in Italy
La Liga players
FC Barcelona players
Expatriate footballers in Spain
Premier League players
Expatriate footballers in England
Doping cases in association football
French sportspeople in doping cases
1998 FIFA World Cup players
2002 FIFA World Cup players
FIFA World Cup-winning players
UEFA Euro 1996 players
UEFA Euro 2000 players
UEFA European Championship-winning players
2001 FIFA Confederations Cup players
FIFA Confederations Cup-winning players
1972 births
Living people
French expatriate footballers
Ligue 1 players
Ligue 2 players
Qatar SC players
Expatriate footballers in Qatar
French expatriate sportspeople in Spain
French expatriate sportspeople in England
French expatriate sportspeople in Qatar
Association football forwards
Qatar Stars League players
Sportspeople from Gironde
Footballers from Nouvelle-Aquitaine